Hyllus is the son of Heracles and Deianira in Greek mythology

Hyllus may also refer to:

Hyllus (mythology), other figures in Greek mythology
Hyllus (river), a river in Asia minor
Hyllus (spider), a genus of spiders